Xi'an or Xian (西安) is the capital of Shaanxi province, China.

Xian or Xi'an may also refer to:

Places
Counties of China, known in Chinese as xiàn (县/縣)
Xian (state) (弦), a minor state during the Zhou dynasty
Xian County (献县/獻縣), a county in the Cangzhou prefecture, Hebei province, China
Xi'an District, Mudanjiang (西安区), in Heilongjiang, China
Xi'an District, Liaoyuan (西安区), formerly Xi'an County, in Jilin, China

People
Xian (surname) (咸; 冼), a Chinese surname
Xian (video game player) or Ho Kun Xian (born 1990), Singaporean fighting games player
Emperor Xian (disambiguation), posthumous name of several Chinese rulers
Ashina Xian, a Western Turk khagan also appointed general by the Tang dynasty
Bi Xian (802–864), official of the Chinese dynasty Tang Dynasty
Dong Xian (23 BCE(?) – 1 BCE), Han Dynasty politician
Dou Xian (died 92 AD), Chinese general and consort kin of the Eastern Han Dynasty
Luo Xian (died 270), military general of the Jin dynasty of China
Ruan Xian, Chinese scholar who lived in the Six Dynasties period
Sheng Xian, official who lived during the late Eastern Han dynasty

Other uses
Xian (abbreviation), a form of the given name Christian
Xi'an (comics), a Marvel Comics character
Xian (Taoism) (仙), in Daoism an immortal or an enlightened person

See also
 
 
 Du Xian (disambiguation)
 Li Xian (disambiguation)
 Liu Xian (disambiguation)
 Prince Xian (disambiguation)
 Wu Xian (disambiguation)
 Zhang Xian (disambiguation)
 Counties of the People's Republic of China, an administrative division in China
 County (Taiwan), an administrative division in Taiwan